Novaya Bykovka is a rural locality (a village) in Vtorovskoye Rural Settlement, Kameshkovsky District, Vladimir Oblast, Russia. The population was 252 as of 2010. There are 2 streets.

Geography 
Novaya Bykovka is located 29 km southwest of Kameshkovo (the district's administrative centre) by road. Lesnoy is the nearest rural locality.

References 

Rural localities in Kameshkovsky District